William Jay (June 16, 1789 – October 14, 1858) was an American abolitionist and jurist, son of Governor of New York and first U.S. Supreme Court Chief Justice John Jay.

Early life
Jay was born in New York City on 16 June 1789, in between his father's terms as United States Secretary of Foreign Affairs in the administration of George Washington. He was the son of John Jay (1745–1829) and Sarah Van Burgh (née Livingston) Jay (1756–1802).  Among his older siblings was Peter Augustus (who served as Recorder of New York City under Richard Riker), Susan, Maria, and Ann Jay.

His maternal grandparents were Susannah (née French) Livingston and William Livingston, an attorney who was a signer of the United States Constitution and later served as the first post-colonial Governor of New Jersey during the American Revolutionary War. His paternal grandparents were Peter Jay, a wealthy trader in furs, wheat, timber, and other commodities, and Mary (née Van Cortlandt) Jay (daughter of New York mayor Jacobus Van Cortlandt).

He graduated from Yale College in 1808.

Career
After his graduation, he took up the management of his father's large estate in Westchester County, New York, and also studied law at Albany. Poor eyesight soon compelled him to give up the legal profession. He early became interested in various philanthropic enterprises and reforms and identified himself especially with the temperance, antislavery, and antiwar movements. He was one of the founders (in 1816) of the American Bible Society, which he defended against the vigorous attacks of the High Church party, led by Bishop John H. Hobart. He was Judge of Common Pleas in New York from 1818 to 1820, and was first judge of Westchester County from 1820 to 1842, when he was removed on account of his anti-slavery views.

An enthusiastic member of the American Anti-Slavery Society, whose constitution he drafted,
Jay stood with James Birney at the head of the conservative abolitionists, and by his calm, logical, and judicial writings exerted for many years a powerful influence. From 1835 to 1837 he was the society's corresponding foreign secretary. In 1840, however, when the society began to advocate measures which he deemed too radical, he withdrew his membership, but with his pen he continued his labor on behalf of the slave, urging emancipation in the District of Columbia and the exclusion of slavery from the territories, though deprecating any attempt to interfere with slavery in the states.

He was also a proponent of antiwar theories and was for many years president of the Peace Society. His pamphlet War and Peace: the Evils of the First with a Plan for Securing the Last, advocating international arbitration, was published by the English Peace Society in 1842, and is said to have contributed to the promulgation, by the powers signing the Treaty of Paris in 1856, of a protocol expressing the wish that nations, before resorting to arms, should have recourse to the good offices of a friendly power.

Personal life
In 1812, Jay was married to Augusta McVickar (1790–1857), the daughter of John McVickar, Esq. of New York. Together, William and Augusta were the parents of eight children, all but two who survived to adulthood.  Their children included:

 Augusta Jay, who married John Nelson.
 Maria Banyer Jay (1802–1851), who married John F. Butterworth. 
 John Jay (1817–1894), who served as U.S. Minister to Austria-Hungary under President Ulysses S. Grant.
 Sarah Louisa Jay (1819–1905), who married Dr. Alexander M. Bruen.
 Eliza Constable Jay (1823–1869), who married Henry Edward Pellew, later 6th Viscount Exmouth, a son of George Pellew, who was Dean of Norwich (himself the third son of Edward Pellew, 1st Viscount Exmouth).
 Augusta Jay (1833–1917), who married Henry Edward Pellew after Eliza's death.

Jay died at his residence in Bedford, New York on 14 October 1858. Through his daughter Eliza, he was a grandfather of Charles Pellew, 7th Viscount Exmouth, a former professor of chemistry at Columbia University.

Assessment
According to Frederick Douglass, Jay "was our wise counsellor, our fine friend, and our liberal benefactor." Lewis Tappan described him as "one of the most talented and useful abolitionists in this country, who, by his pen and active labours, has performed a greater service to the cause than perhaps any other man".

Publications
 
 
 

 
  (On slavery.)
  (On their positions on slavery.)

References

Further reading

Attribution

 (Follows article on his father John Jay.)

  (Follows article on his father John Jay.)

External links
 

1789 births
1858 deaths
American abolitionists
American anti-war activists
American biographers
New York (state) state court judges
American people of Dutch descent
Philanthropists from New York (state)
John Jay
Livingston family
American male biographers
Politicians from New York City
Schuyler family
Yale College alumni
People from Westchester County, New York
American temperance activists
Jay family